Filmon Ghirmai (born 25 January 1979 in Asmara, Eritrea, then People's Democratic Republic of Ethiopia) is a German runner who specialized in the 3000 metres steeplechase.

He came to Stuttgart, Germany, at the age of six as a refugee from the Eritrean War of Independence.

Before specializing in middle distance running, he played association football for VfB Stuttgart. Filmon also studied business economics at the renowned University of Tübingen.

He finished twelfth at the 1998 World Junior Championships and seventh at the 2002 IAAF World Cup. He also competed at the 2002 European Championships and the 2003 World Championships without reaching the finals.

His personal best time is 8:20.50 minutes, achieved in June 2003 in Luzern.

Filmon became German steeplechase champion in 2002, 2004 and 2005. In 2009, he became German 10000 m champion. He has competed for the sports clubs LAC Pliezhausen (1993-2002) and LAV Tübingen (2003–present).

Filmon's coach is the 1992 Olympic Champion over 5000 m, Dieter Baumann.

References
Offizielle Homepage von Filmon Ghirmai

Deutsche Leichtatletik-Verband profile

1979 births
Living people
German male long-distance runners
German national athletics champions
German male steeplechase runners
Eritrean refugees
Eritrean emigrants to Germany
Sportspeople from Asmara